Pleasure driving is a horse show class seen in the United States, which features light breeds of horses and ponies hitched to a two or four-wheeled show cart.  Horses are driven at a walk and two speeds of trot, generally designated as a working or regular trot and an extended "strong" trot.  Many horse breeds compete in Pleasure driving.  Most classes are judged on the horse's manners, performance, quality and conformation.

See also
Horse harness
Fine harness

References

Equestrianism

Sources=http://www.australiancarriagedrivingsocietyvic.org.au/